Jerzy Ogórczyk (8 February 1937 — 8 April 2012) was a Polish ice hockey player. He played for Górnik Katowice and Baildon Katowice during his career. With Górnik he won the Polish hockey league championship in 1958 and 1960. He also played for the Polish national team at several world championships as well as the 1964 Winter Olympics.

References

External links
 

1937 births
2012 deaths
Baildon Katowice players
GKS Katowice (ice hockey) players
Ice hockey players at the 1964 Winter Olympics
Olympic ice hockey players of Poland
Polish ice hockey forwards
Sportspeople from Katowice